Marie Jaquelin Watters Colton (October 20, 1922 – September 25, 2018) was an American politician who represented the 51st district in the North Carolina House of Representatives from 1978 to 1994.

Colton was born in Charlotte, North Carolina and was educated at Saint Mary's Junior College in Raleigh. In 1943, she graduated from University of North Carolina at Chapel Hill with a degree in Romance languages. During World War II, Watters served a code-breaker for the United States Army Signal Corps at Arlington Hall. Marie Watters married Henry E. Colton. The couple first lived in Chapel Hill and later in Asheville. After her husband, an Asheville City Councilman, declined to run for state office, Marie Colton campaigned and won the seat. During her sixteen years of service, Colton focused on such issues as conservation and environmentalism, billboards, alternative medicine, tax reform, historic preservation, tourism and economic development in western North Carolina, child welfare protection, domestic violence laws, legislative ethics reform, and allowing local school boards to ban corporal punishment.

Colton, a Democrat, was the first female Speaker Pro Tempore of the House, serving in that role from 1991 to 1994. In recognition of her advocacy of women and children's issues, Colton was appointed to the United Nations Commission on the Status of Women in 1994. In 1998, she was elected to the Common Cause National Governing Board. Colton was inducted into the North Carolina Women's Hall of Fame in 2009.

References

External links
 Inventory of the Marie Watters Colton Scrapbooks and Audiocassette, 1978-1994, in the Southern Historical Collection, UNC-Chapel Hill.
 Southern Oral History Program Interviews with Marie Watters Colton: North Carolina Politics, October 23, 1995; Southern Women: Women's Leadership and Activism, November 24, 1994

1922 births
2018 deaths
Democratic Party members of the North Carolina House of Representatives
St. Mary's School (North Carolina) alumni
University of North Carolina at Chapel Hill alumni
Women state legislators in North Carolina
20th-century American politicians
20th-century American women politicians
Politicians from Asheville, North Carolina
Politicians from Charlotte, North Carolina
21st-century American women